Buddleja marrubiifolia, commonly known as the woolly butterflybush, is a perennial shrub which is endemic to the Chihuahuan Desert from southern Texas to San Luis Potosí in Mexico, where it grows on limestone and gypsum soils in canyons and arroyos at elevations of  elevation. The species was first named and described by George Bentham in 1846.

Description
Ploidy: 2n = 38.

Cultivation
The shrub is cultivated throughout Tucson, Arizona to attract butterflies. It is also planted as an ornamental in Hawaii. The shrub is in commerce in France, sold by several specialist alpine nurseries, and was introduced to the UK in February 2013, with one small plant acquired by the Longstock Park Nursery, NCCPG national buddleja collection holders, and another by the Royal Botanic Garden Edinburgh.
Hardiness: USDA zone 7.

Hybrids and cultivars
'Presidio' A relatively cold-hardy selection, the cultivar 'Presidio' was raised by Logan Calhoun of Texas. Hardiness: USDA zones 8–10.

References

marrubiifolia
Flora of Northeastern Mexico
Flora of Texas
Flora of the Chihuahuan Desert
Flora of the United States
Dioecious plants